Scirpophaga is a genus of moths of the family Crambidae described by Georg Friedrich Treitschke in 1832. Asian species include significant rice stemborer pests.

Taxonomy
The genus Scirpophaga was first introduced by Treitschke in 1832 as a monotypic genus; including as single species Scirpophaga phantasmatella (which he misspelled as S. phantasmella, and which is now known as S. praelata).

During most of history this genus has been completely confused, with most specimens being wrongly identified and most taxa being based on a type series containing numerous species. Males and females of the same species were often recognised as two independent species. Almost two centuries after the first species was described, in 1960 the Australian entomologist Ian Francis Bell Common was the first to examine the genitalia (for centuries the standard method by which one determines species in Lepidoptera) of the Australian specimens in this group, recombining and splitting the then defined genera into a number of new genera. He created the new genus Tryporyza, in which he incorporated two species: Chilo incertulas and Tipanaea innotata (of which DNA research in 2019 has shown should be synonymised with Scirpophaga nivella). In 1980 P. Wang also classified Scirpophaga nivella within the genus Tryporyza, only to have Angoon Lewvanich, after an exhaustive study of the genitals of over 6000 specimens from throughout the range of the group, to retire the genus Tryporyza as a synonym of Scirpophaga in the following year (1981).

Treitschke gives as etymology for the generic epithet the word Scirpus, a type of plant commonly known as a "rush", and the Ancient Greek word φαγεῖν (transliterated phageîn), which means "to eat".

Description
Palpi porrect (extending forward) extending from once to twice the length of head, slightly hairy, and with downcurved third joint. Maxillary palp rather short and dilated with scales. A slight rounded frontal projection can be seen. Antennae of male minutely serrated, and ciliated. Patagia of male with spreading upturned hair. Tibia with outer spurs about half the length of inner. Abdomen long, where in female expanding at extremity and with very large anal tuft. Wings long and narrow. Forewings with vein 3 from before angle of cell. Veins 4 and 5 from angle and vein 7 straight and well separated from veins 8 and 9. Veins 10 and 11 free, or vein 11 becoming coincident with vein 12. Hindwings with vein 3 from near angle of cell. Veins 6 and 7 from upper angle.

Species
praelata species group
Scirpophaga gilviberbis Zeller, 1863
Scirpophaga humilis Wang, Li & Chen, 1986
Scirpophaga imparellus (Meyrick, 1878)
Scirpophaga melanoclista Meyrick, 1935
Scirpophaga nivella (Fabricius, 1794)
Scirpophaga parvalis (Wileman, 1911)
Scirpophaga percna Common, 1960
Scirpophaga praelata (Scopoli, 1763)
Scirpophaga phaedima Common, 1960
Scirpophaga xantharrenes Common, 1960
Scirpophaga xanthopygata Schawerda, 1922
excerptalis species group
Scirpophaga adunctella Chen, Song & Wu, 2006
Scirpophaga bradleyi Lewvanich, 1981
Scirpophaga brunnealis (Hampson, 1919)
Scirpophaga excerptalis (Walker, 1863)
Scirpophaga flavidorsalis (Hampson, 1919)
Scirpophaga khasis Lewvanich, 1981
Scirpophaga linguatella Chen, Song & Wu, 2006
Scirpophaga magnella de Joannis, 1930
Scirpophaga ochritinctalis (Hampson, 1919)
Scirpophaga xanthogastrella (Walker, 1863)
Scirpophaga tongyaii Lewvanich, 1981
occidentella species group
Scirpophaga fusciflua Hampson, 1893
Scirpophaga goliath Marion & Viette, 1953
Scirpophaga marginepunctellus (de Joannis, 1927)
Scirpophaga occidentella (Walker, 1863)
Scirpophaga ochroleuca Meyrick, 1882
Scirpophaga serenus (Meyrick, 1935)
Scirpophaga subumbrosa Meyrick, 1933
Scirpophaga virginia Schultze, 1908
lineata species group
Scirpophaga lineata (Butler, 1879)
Scirpophaga auristrigellus (Hampson, 1896)
Scirpophaga aurivena (Hampson, 1903)
incertulas species group
Scirpophaga incertulas (Walker, 1863)
Scirpophaga innotata (Walker, 1863)
gotoi species group
Scirpophaga gotoi Lewvanich, 1981
whalleyi species group
Scirpophaga whalleyi Lewvanich, 1981
unknown species group
Scirpophaga bipunctatus (Rothschild in Sjöstedt, 1926)
Scirpophaga fulvilinealis Hampson, 1900
Scirpophaga kumatai Lewvanich, 1981
Scirpophaga micraurea Sasaki, 1994
Scirpophaga nepalensis Lewvanich, 1981
Scirpophaga terrella Hampson, 1896

References

 Chen, F.Q., Song, S. & Weng, C.S. (2006). "A review of the genus Scirpophaga Treitschke, 1832 in China (Lepidoptera: Pyralidae)" Zootaxa 1236: 1-22.
 Fabricius (1794). Entomologia Systematica emendata et Aucta 3(2): 296.

 Schawerda (1922). Z. öst. Ent. ver. 7: 11.
 Scopoli (1763). Ent. carniolica, exhibens Ins. Carnioliae indigena: 198.
 Treitschke (1832). Die Schmetterlinge von Europa 9(1): 55.
 Wang P, Li, C. & Chen, X. (1986) Acta Entomologica Sinica 29 (2): 208–210.
 Wileman (1911). Transactions of the Entomological Society of London: 355.

Schoenobiinae
Crambidae genera
Taxa named by Georg Friedrich Treitschke